Arnfield is an area of Derbyshire, England. It is located on the north side of Tintwistle (where the population is included), adjacent to the Arnfield Reservoir.

References

Villages in Derbyshire
High Peak, Derbyshire